Lai Ching Lung (born 1948) is a Hong Kong medical physician. Lai studied at Diocesan Boys' School, and subsequently in the Li Ka Shing Faculty of Medicine for Bachelor of Medicine and Bachelor of Surgery in 1970. Asteroid 26743 Laichinglung, discovered by Bill Yeung in 2001, was named after him. The official  was published by the Minor Planet Center on 6 April 2019.

Career 
In 1971, Lai started working in the Department of Medicine, The University of Hong Kong. In 1987, Lai started his research into the treatment of hepatitis B. In 2003, Lai became a Professor of Medicine and Hepatology, University of Hong Kong. In 2011, Lai was appointed to the Simon K Y Lee Professorship in Gastroenterology. Lai is a Professor of Internal Medicine and Hepatology. Despite having retired in 2014, he is still working in the hospital and teaching in the university.

Personal life 
Lai's sister is Helen Yu, a former director of Education Bureau.

References 
 

1948 births
L
L
Living people
Hong Kong medical doctors